Chrysaethe jorgei is a species of beetle in the family Cerambycidae. It was described by Tavakilian and Penaherrera-Leiva in 2003.

References

jorgei
Beetles described in 2003